Maximum experimental safe gap (MESG)  is a standardized measurement of how easily a gas flame will pass through a narrow gap bordered by heat-absorbing metal.  MESG is used to classify flammable gases for the design and/or selection of electrical equipment in hazardous areas, and flame arrestor devices. The National Electric Code classifies Class I hazardous locations into different groups depending on the respective MESG's of gases in the area.

Examples

References

http://site.ul.com/global/documents/offerings/services/hazardouslocations/CI_groups.pdf

Electrical safety
Fire test standards